Spodiopogon cotulifer is a species of perennial grass in the family Poaceae. It is native to East and Southeast Asia.

It is the most likely wild progenitor of Spodiopogon formosanus, a cultivated millet that is endemic to Taiwan.

References

cotulifer
Grasses of Asia
Grasses of China
Flora of Taiwan
Plants described in 1889